A maser is a device that produces coherent electromagnetic waves.

Maser may also refer to:
 Maser (rocket), a sounding rocket launched from Esrange in Sweden
 Maser, Veneto, a municipality in Italy
 Astrophysical maser, a naturally occurring source of stimulated spectral line emission
 Maser, a codename later used by the DC Comics character Air Wave

People with the surname
 Mike Maser (1947–2019), an American football coach and player
 Werner Maser (1922–2007), German historian and author of books about Adolf Hitler

See also
Mazer (disambiguation)